Melanoma-associated antigen C2 is a protein that in humans is encoded by the MAGEC2 gene.

This gene is related to members of the MAGEC gene family. It is not expressed in normal tissues, except for testis, and is expressed in tumors of various histological types. This gene and the MAGEC genes are clustered on chromosome Xq26-q27.

References

Further reading